Will, Opportunity and Solidarity is a political party in Guatemala.

History
The political party was registered with the Supreme Electoral Tribunal in 2020. Immigrant rights activist Marcos Antil is one of the party's founders. Secretary General Carlos Bezares was previously candidate for URNG, Movimiento Nueva República and Libre.

The National Unity of Hope had an internal division between deputies opponents and supporters of Sandra Torres in 2020, caused by Torres's accusations of corruption and poor electoral results in 2019, as well as her support for the government of Alejandro Giammattei. A faction opposing Torres removed her as leader and expelled her from the party in 2021. However, the Supreme Electoral Tribunal ruled in favor of Torres and allowed her to continue as party leader.

A few days after the decision of the electoral court, the opposition group to Sandra Torres announced its resignation from the National Unity of Hope, to found the "Parliamentary Opposition Group", in reference to its parliamentary opposition to the Giammattei government.

The Parliamentary Opposition Group and deputy Aldo Dávila approached the Will, Opportunity and Solidarity political party. On 7 December 2022, the party was registered with the electoral body. 

On 22 December 2022, former presidential candidate Manuel Villacorta joined the party.

Electoral results

Presidential elections

Congress of the Republic

References

External links

2020 establishments in Guatemala
Political parties established in 2020
Socialist parties in Guatemala